The Bastardz are a Croatian jazz, funk band, founded by guitarist Zoran Jaeger-Jex.
The Bastardz are active in both their native Croatia and the Netherlands, where Jaeger-Jex has collaborated with other musicians.

Discography

Albums
 Your Love (EP) (1995)
 C'est Universal (1996)
 The Groove Resistance (1998)
 Muzika ljubavi (2000)
 Chronological (2003)
 The Bastardz Go Jazzy (Live) (2003)

External links
 The Bastardz official site

Croatian musical groups
Musical groups established in 1995